Walker Township is a township in Anderson County, Kansas, United States. As of the 2010 census, its population was 668.

History
Walker Township was established in 1857. It was named for Robert J. Walker, fourth Territorial Governor of Kansas.

Geography
According to the USGS, it contains two cemeteries: Saint John and Sutton Valley.

The stream of South Fork Pottawatomie Creek runs through this township.

References
 USGS Geographic Names Information System (GNIS)

External links
 US-Counties.com
 City-Data.com

Townships in Anderson County, Kansas
Townships in Kansas
1857 establishments in Kansas Territory